Crack'd Pot Trail is the fourth novella by Canadian author Steven Erikson in his Malazan Book of the Fallen series. It is preceded by The Lees of Laughter's End, and will be followed by another two novellas.  The novella was released in December 2009 with 300 traycased, signed and jacketed hardcovers with color plates and 700 unjacketed and unsigned hardcovers copies available for pre-order.

References

2009 Canadian novels
Novels by Steven Erikson
Malazan Book of the Fallen
PS Publishing books